Bösleben-Wüllersleben is a municipality in the district Ilm-Kreis, in Thuringia, Germany.

References

Ilm-Kreis
Schwarzburg-Rudolstadt